Whispering Pines is an unincorporated community in Lake County, California. It is located south of Loch Lomond. The ZIP Code is 95461. The community is inside area code 707.

History
Much of the community was destroyed by the Valley Fire in September, 2015.

Government

References

External links
 Whispering Pines Website

Unincorporated communities in California
Unincorporated communities in Lake County, California